Marta is a 1971 Spanish thriller film directed by José Antonio Nieves Conde. The film was selected as the Spanish entry for the Best Foreign Language Film at the 44th Academy Awards, but was not accepted as a nominee. 

The film was released in Italy as ...dopo di che, uccide il maschio e lo divora (which translates as Afterwards, It Kills and Devours the Male). It wasn't released theatrically in the U.S. until January 1974. 

Juan José Alonso Millán wrote the original 1969 Madrid stage play which he later adapted into the film's screenplay.

Plot
A rich landowner named Don Miguel is haunted by his deceased mother's ghost, since years earlier he murdered her when she walked in on his lovemaking. Pilar, a beautiful fugitive on the run for killing a man, seeks to stay for a while at Miguel's mansion and the two develop a sexual relationship. The woman bears a striking resemblance to his missing wife Marta, who disappeared years earlier. Miguel always suspected his wife may have been murdered.

Cast
 Marisa Mell dual role as both Marta & Pilar
 Stephen Boyd as Don Miguel
 George Rigaud as Arturo
 Howard Ross as Luis
 Jesús Puente as Don Carlos
 Isa Miranda as Elena
 Nélida Quiroga as Dona Clara

See also
 List of submissions to the 44th Academy Awards for Best Foreign Language Film
 List of Spanish submissions for the Academy Award for Best Foreign Language Film

References

External links
 

1971 films
1970s thriller films
1970s Spanish-language films
Spanish thriller films
Films directed by José Antonio Nieves Conde
Films scored by Piero Piccioni
1970s Spanish films